C42 or C-42 may refer to:

Vehicles 
 Alfa Romeo C42, a Swiss Formula One car
 Douglas C-42, an American military transport aircraft
 Ikarus C42, a German microlight aircraft
 Neiva Regente C-42, a Brazilian military transport aircraft

Other uses 
 C42 (TV channel), a former New Zealand television channel
 C42 road (Namibia)
 Caldwell 42, a globular cluster
 City 42, formerly C42, a television channel in Pakistan
 Petrov's Defence, a chess opening